Masahiro is a masculine Japanese given name. Notable people with the name include:

, Japanese councillor (Rōjū)
, Japanese baseball player
, Japanese footballer
, Japanese ski jumper
, Japanese artist
, Japanese footballer
, Japanese guitarist and composer
, Japanese baseball player
, American-Japanese wrestler
, Japanese footballer
, Japanese footballer
, Japanese footballer
, Japanese politician
, Japanese footballer
, Japanese racing driver
, Japanese ice hockey player
, Japanese footballer
, Japanese politician
 actor
, Japanese politician
, Japanese footballer
, Japanese video game artist
, Japanese footballer
Masahiro Kamiya born 1963, Japanese actor
, Japanese murderer
Masahiro Kaneko (born 1991), Japanese footballer
Masahiro Kano (born 1977), Japanese footballer
, Japanese baseball player
, Japanese musician and composer
, Japanese footballer
, Japanese watchmaker
, Japanese actor and voice actor
, Japanese film director
, Japanese footballer
, Japanese astronomer
, Japanese sumo wrestler
, Japanese weightlifter
, Japanese rugby union player and coach
, Japanese golfer
, Japanese actor
, Japanese film director
Masahiro Matsunaga (born 1960), Japanese racing driver
, Japanese drummer and actor
, Japanese footballer
, Japanese footballer
, Japanese ceramic designer
, Japanese roboticist
, Japanese philosopher
, Japanese politician
, Japanese actor
, Japanese director
, Japanese singer, actor and host
, Japanese basketball player
, Japanese footballer
, Japanese baseball player
, Japanese voice actor
, Japanese footballer
, Japanese footballer
Masahiro Ota (born 1970), Japanese footballer
, Japanese daimyō
, Japanese video game designer
, Japanese ice hockey player
, Japanese pianist
, Japanese volleyball player
, Japanese motorcycle racer
Masahiro Shimmyo (born 1972), Japanese footballer
, Japanese film director
, Japanese footballer
, Japanese politician
, Japanese footballer
, Japanese judoka
, Japanese actor
, Japanese court noble
, Japanese rower
, Japanese sumo wrestler
, Japanese baseball player
, Japanese sumo wrestler
, Japanese actor
, Japanese footballer
, Japanese screenwriter and poet
, Japanese sociologist
, Japanese baseball player
, Japanese kickboxer
, Japanese voice actor
, Japanese volleyball player
, Japanese cyclist
, Japanese scholar
, Japanese swimmer

Swordsmiths

One of several historical Katana swordsmiths (and the swords crafted by them), including:
, a disciple of  
, latter half 17th century
, a.k.a. See List of Wazamono for this and the preceding swordmaker

See also

 , a kitchen knife manufacturer based in Seki, Gifu, and its Masahiro (正広) line of knives.
 , a trade brand of inexpensive katana for the North American market, manufactured by several Chinese workshops.

References

Japanese masculine given names